Tierra Blanca is a district of the Cartago canton, in the Cartago province of Costa Rica.

History 
Tierra Blanca was created on 5 December 1919 by Decreto Ejecutivo 22.

Geography 
Tierra Blanca has an area of  km² and an elevation of  metres. It is located about 3 miles north of the city of Cartago, Costa Rica; resting on the slopes of the mountain whose summit is the Irazú Volcano.

Demographics 

For the 2011 census, Tierra Blanca had a population of  inhabitants.

Transportation

Road transportation 
The district is covered by the following road routes:
 National Route 401

Economy 
Tierra Blanca is a small farming community made up of about 5,000 inhabitants of mostly Spanish descent. The people of Tierra Blanca farm mostly potatoes, onions and carrots, with a few who farm strawberries as well. The climate is moderate, but cold in comparison with the rest of Costa Rica.

References 

Districts of Cartago Province
Populated places in Cartago Province